This is an alphabetized list of musicians who have made significant use of Danelectro, Silvertone or Coral guitars, basses, sitars and effects in live performances or studio recordings.

A

Ibrahim "Abaraybone" Alhabib plays a Danelectro.
Niklas Almqvist plays a Danelectro U2 on "Hate To Say I Told You So"
Dave Alvin uses Danelectro pedals and effects
Victoria de Angelis (Måneskin)

B

Richard Barone  played a Danelectro on his Clouds Over Eden album, specifically "Nobody Knows Me" and "Paper Airplane"
Syd Barrett used a single-coil Danelectro 59 DC on the first two Pink Floyd albums.
Beck plays a vintage Silvertone guitar and often a Dano Pro
Jeff Beck played a baritone guitar on his 2003 release Jeff.
Billy Bragg
Phoebe Bridgers plays a Danelectro Black Metalflake 56 Baritone guitar.
Jack Bruce used a Danelectro bass
Peter Buck guitarist and co-founder of R.E.M. uses Danelectro 12-strings.
R. L. Burnside

C

J. J. Cale
Randy California
Glen Campbell
Mike Campbell uses Danelectro guitars, pedals and effects
Eric Clapton used a Danelectro 59-DC
Nels Cline uses Silvertone and Danelectro guitars on his album Instrumentals
Bruce Cockburn
Ry Cooder plays slide guitar on Silvertone guitars.
Elvis Costello appeared in ads for Danelectro when the brand was relaunched in the late 1990s and plays Danelectro and Silvertone guitars on his album When I Was Cruel.

D

Rob Darken
Mac Demarco
Dum Dum Girls
Victoria De Angelis

E

Steve Earle
Dave Edmunds
John Entwistle used a Longhorn bass in the 1960s
Melissa Etheridge
Mark Oliver Everett  from Eels plays a variety of different coloured Danelectro Pro 56 and a black Danelectro Baritone.

F

Fat Mike  plays a Danelectro DC bass.
Samantha Fish plays a Danelectro Silver Metalflake 56 Baritone guitar.
John Flansburgh has a Longhorn guitar he is famous for.
John Fogerty
Matthew Followill  plays a Danelectro u2 on "Genius"
John Frusciante
Tomethy Furse

G

Rory Gallagher played a Silvertone amongst many other guitars.
Jerry Garcia got a Danelectro as his first guitar.
Rinus Gerritsen of a Golden Earring plays a Longhorn bass.
Tom Guerra

H

Rene Hall Used a Dan-0 6-string bass on many tunes including Ritchie Valens' "La Bamba"
Kirk Hammett
George Harrison
Richard Hawley
Alvin Youngblood Hart
Richard Hell
Jimi Hendrix
Greg Hill
Josh Homme
Earl Hooker
John Lee Hooker
Lightnin' Hopkins
Steve Howe
J. B. Hutto

J

Mick Jagger
Damien Jurado
Jupiter Apple

K

Ira Kaplan
King Buzzo uses a Danelectro in the studio.
Kira used a Danelectro guitar in concerts from about 2004–2007.
Mark Knopfler

L

Jeff Lang
Alvin Lee
Alex Lifeson
David Lindley uses a Silvertone in concert
Arto Lindsay
Gary Louris

M

Ian MacKaye
Bo Madsen
Steve Marriott
Chan Marshall
Jeff Martin
Dave Matthews
Mike McCready
James McNew
Tyson Meade
Stephin Merritt
Jason Molina
Thurston Moore

N

Graham Nash plays a Danelectro Longhorn on "Just One Look" with The Hollies on Shindig! in 1965
Dave Navarro
A.C. Newman
Colin Newman
Juice Newton

O

Conor Oberst

P

Jimmy Page used a modified 59 DC Danelectro (scruffy white one he said he paid £30 for in early 1966) in studio when he was a session guitarist, and for live performances of “Kashmir”, “White Summer, Black Mountain Side” and “In My Time of Dying” with Led Zeppelin.
Brad Paisley
Rick Parfitt
Joe Perry
Tom Petersson
Tom Petty on the Wildflowers album; with the Traveling Wilburys he played a Longhorn bass.
Cat Power
Elvis Presley
Steve Priest

R

Dee Dee Ramone
Noel Redding
Kid Rock
Daniel Rossen
Daniel Rostén

S

Richie Sambora frequently uses Danelectro guitars and effects in concert and in the studio.
Robert Schneider uses a Danelectro in concert
Pat Smear
Fred Smith who began performing with New York punk act Television in 1975. 
Joey Spampinato NRBQ Single cut, dbl cut, and Longhorn basses throughout his career
Alan Sparhawk
Bruce Springsteen
Billy Squier has been seen using a 59 dc during his concerts
Chris Squire Danelectro Longhorn 6 string bass
Ken Stringfellow

T

Garry Tallent
Jagori Tanna (I Mother Earth)
Porl Thompson (The Cure) used 2 Danelectro guitars during The Cure 2005 Tour
Richard Thompson used a Danelectro U2 on several recordings
Pete Townshend
Corin Tucker uses a Danelectro Baritone in the studio and a DC-3 early in her career
Ike Turner
Jeff Tweedy

V

Eddie Van Halen - used Danelectro necks on various guitars.
Jimmie Vaughan
Tom Verlaine

W

Tom Waits
Miroslav Wanek plays a Danelectro on several albums
Brian Wilson
Amy Winehouse is seen playing a Danelectro in her documentary AMY.
Ron Wood
Link Wray used a Danelectro Longhorn during his heyday

Y

Thom Yorke

Z

Frank Zappa

References

Danelectro